Events in the year 1892 in Brazil.

Incumbents

Federal government 
President: Marshal Floriano Peixoto
Vice-President: vacant

Governors 
 Alagoas: Manuel Gomes Riberio (until 24 March), Gabino Besuoro (starting 24 March)
 Amazonas:
 until 27 February: Gregório Taumaturgo Azevedo 
 27 February: José Inácio Borges Machado
 starting 27 February: Eduardo Gonçalves Ribeiro
 Bahia: Leal Ferreira then Rodrigues Lima
 Ceará: José Clarindo de Queirós, until 16 February
João Nepomuceno de Medeiros Mallet, until 18 February
Benjamin Liberato Barroso, until 12 July
Antônio Nogueira Accioli, until 27 August
José Bezerril Fontenelle
 Goiás:
 until February 19: Constâncio Ribeiro da Maia
 February 19 - July 17: Brás Abrantes
 from July 17: Antônio Caiado
 Maranhão:
 until January 8: Maranhão Governing Board of 1891
 January 8 - November 30: Manuel Belfort Vieira
 from November 30: Alfredo Martins
 Mato Grosso: 
 Minas Gerais: 
 until February 9: Cesário Alvim
 February 9 - July 13: Eduardo Ernesto da Gama Cerqueira
 from July 14: Afonso Pena
 Pará: Lauro Sodré
 Paraíba:
until February 18: Paraíba governing board of 1891
from February 18: Álvaro Lopes Machado
 Paraná: 
 until April 7: Antônio Epaminondas de Barros Correia
 April 7 - April 20: Ambrósio Machado da Cunha Cavalcanti
 From April 20: Alexandre José Barbosa Lima
 Pernambuco:
 until April 7: Antônio Epaminondas de Barros Correia
 April 7 - 20: Ambrósio Machado da Cunha Cavalcanti
 from April 20: Alexandre José Barbosa Lima
 Piauí:
 until February 11: Álvaro Lopes Machado
 from February 11: Coriolano de Carvalho e Silva
 Rio Grande do Norte: 
 until February 22: Governing board consisting of: Francisco de Lima e Silva, Joaquim Ferreira Chaves, and Manuel do Nascimento Castro and Silva
 February 22-28: Jerome Américo Raposo Chamber
 from February 28: Pedro de Albuquerque Maranhão
 Rio Grande do Sul: 
 until June 8: Military Junta of 1891
 June 8-16: José Antônio Correia da Câmara
 June 16-17: Júlio Prates de Castilhos
 from June 17: Vitoriano Ribeiro Carneiro Monteiro
 Santa Catarina:
 São Paulo: 
 Sergipe:

Vice governors 
 Rio de Janeiro: 
 Rio Grande do Norte:
 São Paulo:

Events
21 May - The French-built monitor Solimoes is wrecked off Cape Polonio, Uruguay, with the loss of 125 lives.
date unknown
Danish botanist Eugenius Warming gives the first detailed description of the Brazilian cerrado in his book Lagoa Santa.
The Afro-Brazilian practice of Capoeira is banned (not to be re-legalised until 1937).

Births
20 January - Sud Mennucci, journalist and educator (died 1948)
20 March - Menotti Del Picchia, poet, journalist and painter (died 1982)
23 April - Francisco Cavalcanti Pontes de Miranda, lawyer and diplomat (died 1979)
18 July - Arthur Friedenreich, soccer player, regarded by some as the sport's first outstanding black player (died 1969)
23 July - João de Souza Mendes, chess master (died 1969)
4 October - Assis Chateaubriand, lawyer, journalist, politician and diplomat (died 1968)
27 October - Graciliano Ramos, modernist writer, politician and journalist (died 1953)

Deaths
23 August - Deodoro da Fonseca, first president of the Republic of Brazil (born 1827)

References

 
1890s in Brazil
Years of the 19th century in Brazil
Brazil
Brazil